Ge with stroke and caron (Ғ̌) is a letter of the Cyrillic script. It is used in the Shughni language.

It is related to, but not the same as, a normal Ge (Г).

See Also 
Ge with caron